The Great Tancheng earthquake (Chinese: 郯城 地震; pinyin: Tánchéng dìzhèn), also known as the Shandong earthquake, was a major seismic event that occurred during the rule of the Qing dynasty. The earthquake occurred in Shandong Province on July 25, 1668. The earthquake had an estimated magnitude of  8.5, making it the largest historical earthquake in East China, and one of the largest to occur on land. The earthquake had cataclysmic implications to the region. An estimated 43,000 to 50,000 lives were lost in the earthquake, and its effects were widely felt. The epicenter may have been located between Ju County and Tancheng counties, northeast of the prefecture-level city of Linyi in southern Shandong.

Geological setting 
The earthquake occurred halfway between Beijing and Shanghai, where seismic activity is infrequent. There had not been any major earthquakes in the area for over 150 years.

The earthquake of 1668 occurred along the Yishu Fault, a segment of the massive Tan-Lu Fault zone which formed in the Mesozoic. This fault has an estimated slip rate of less than 1–2.6 mm/yr. The slip sense of the fault was mainly dextral strike-slip with a small thrust component. Seismic inversion suggest a  rupture area on a near-vertical, north–south striking fault. Another destructive earthquake in 1969 was also produced along the Tan-Lu Fault Zone.

Impact 
The powerful earthquake was felt in 379 counties, 29 of which experienced catastrophic damage. It also affected Jiangsu, Anhui, Zhejiang, Fujian, Jiangxi, Hubei, Henan, Hebei, Shanxi, Shaanxi, Liaoning, and Korea. There was a  radial zone of damage around Tancheng, Linyi and Ju County. It is considered one of the most destructive in Chinese history. The earthquake produced strong shaking assigned XII (Extreme) on the Modified Mercalli intensity scale, the most destructive shaking an earthquake could achieve.

In Ju County alone, more than 20,000 people were killed. Residential and official homes were destroyed. Schools, temples, warehouses and the city walls toppled. In Mashi, Wulugu, Yanjiagu, Shifengdo, Keluodo and Maqi, landslides occurred on the hills. Widespread land subsidence and collapse occurred. One fissure measured  from Guanzhuang to Gehu along a river cliff. It ejected dust, sand and water. At three wells, water was ejected  into the air.

In Tancheng, battlements, government buildings, homes, a watchtower, temples and storehouses were completely destroyed. Over 8,700 people died. Fissures were reportedly so wide that people were unable to walk over it. The bottom of these fissures were also too deep to be seen. At Lizhuang, a town in the county, massive subsidence occurred.

In Linyi, no homes, city walls and temples were left intact. There were over 6,900 reported fatalities. Black water was said to emerge from fissures. Many nearby cities walls fell, and some parts flooded by overflowing rivers and wells. Fissures caused water and sand to erupt, burying homes. Many livestock also died. Heavy damage occurred in Ganyu.

Tsunami
Historical records also documented a probable tsunami in the region. It was reported that coastal cities were flooded and rivers overflowed.

Response
The Kangxi Emperor ordered his ministry to handle the relief efforts. In 40 prefectures and counties, tax fees were waived. Over 227,300 taels of silver were issued.

See also
List of historical earthquakes
List of earthquakes in China

References 

Earthquakes in China
1668 disasters
1668 in Asia
1668 earthquakes
Tsunamis in China
Geography of East China
History of Shandong
Geography of Shandong